Robert McLean may refer to:
Robert McLean (minister) (1846–1926, American Presbyterian minister and legislator
Robert McLean (engineer) (1884–1964), Scottish industrialist
Robert McLean (footballer) (1884–1936), Scottish professional footballer
Douglas Maclean (1852–1929), also known as Sir Robert Donald Douglas Maclean, New Zealand MP and farmer

See also
Bob McLean (disambiguation)
Robert MacLean (disambiguation)